BPM 150 Max is the third studio album by J-pop duo Two-Mix, released by King Records on November 21, 1996. It includes the singles "Love Revolution" (theme from the TV Asahi drama Kirara) and "Rhythm Generation" (opening theme from the TV Tokyo anime series Godzilla Kingdom).

The album peaked at No. 2 on Oricon's weekly albums chart, becoming the duo's highest-charting album. It was also certified Gold by the RIAJ.

Track listing 
All lyrics are written by Shiina Nagano; all music is composed by Minami Takayama; all music is arranged by Two-Mix.

Charts

Certification

References

External links 
 
 

1996 albums
Two-Mix albums
Japanese-language albums
King Records (Japan) albums